Storming Heaven may refer to:
Storming Heaven (Brown novel), a 1994 novel by Dale Brown
Storming Heaven (Giardina novel), a 1987 novel by Denise Giardina
Storming Heaven (comics), a comic strip by Gordon Rennie and Frazer Irving
Storming Heaven: LSD and the American Dream, a 1987 book by Jay Stevens
Storming Heaven: Class composition and struggle in Italian Autonomist Marxism, a 2002 book by Steve Wright